Ross Killian (born 18 July 1977) is an Irish sailor. He competed in the men's 470 event at the 2004 Summer Olympics.

References

External links
 

1977 births
Living people
Irish male sailors (sport)
Olympic sailors of Ireland
Sailors at the 2004 Summer Olympics – 470
Sportspeople from Dublin (city)